The Great Lakes Storm of 1913 (historically referred to as the "Big Blow", the "Freshwater Fury", and the "White Hurricane") was a blizzard with hurricane-force winds that devastated the Great Lakes Basin in the Midwestern United States and Southwestern Ontario, Canada, from November 7 to 10, 1913. The storm was most powerful on November 9, battering and overturning ships on four of the five Great Lakes, particularly Lake Huron. 

The storm was the deadliest and most destructive natural disaster to hit the lakes in recorded history. More than 250 people were killed. Shipping was hard hit; 19 ships were destroyed, and 19 others were stranded. About $1 million of cargo weighing about 68,300 tons—including coal, iron ore, and grain—was lost.
The extratropical cyclone originated when two major storm fronts that were fueled by the lakes' relatively warm waters—a seasonal process called a "November gale"—converged. Winds exceeding hurricane force occurred over four of the Great Lakes for extended periods creating very large waves. The large size of the Great Lakes provides wind fetches (the length of water over which a given wind has blown without obstruction) of hundreds of miles, allowing huge waves to form. Rogue waves are known to occur on the Great Lakes, including waves reinforced by reflections from the vertical shores of some of the Great Lakes. Waves on the Great Lakes (especially the shallower ones) can be steeper and closer together than on the ocean allowing less recovery time between waves. Compared to the ocean, the Great Lakes also have less maneuvering "sea room" and closer proximity to shores making it more difficult for ships to weather storms.

The U.S. Weather Bureau failed to predict the intensity of the storm, and the process of preparing and communicating predictions was slow. These factors contributed to the storm's destructiveness. The contemporaneous weather forecasters did not have enough data, communications, analysis capability, and understanding of atmospheric dynamics to predict the storm. They could not predict wind directions, which is key to the ability of ships to avoid or cope with the effects of storms.

Background 
The water in the five Great Lakes holds heat that allows them to remain relatively warm late into the year and postpones the cooling and first frosts in the region. During the autumn, two major weather tracks converge over the area. Cold, dry air moves south and southeast from Alberta and northern Canada as an Alberta clipper while warm, moist air moves north and northeast from the Gulf of Mexico along the lee of the central Rocky Mountains as a Colorado low. The collision of these air masses forms large storm systems in the middle of the North American continent, including the Great Lakes. When the cold air from these storms moves over the lakes, it is warmed by the waters below and picks up a spin. As the cyclonic system continues over the lakes, its power is intensified by the jet stream above and the warm waters below.

Fueled by the warm lake water, these powerful storms may remain over the Great Lakes for days. November gales have caused several large storms over the Great Lakes, with at least 25 killer storms affecting the region since 1847. During the Mataafa Storm in 1905, 27 wooden vessels were lost. During a November gale in 1975, the giant bulk carrier  sank suddenly without sending a distress signal and with all crew still on board. The large size of the Great Lakes provides fetches of hundreds of miles allowing huge waves to be developed. Their large unobstructed spaces result in wind speeds higher than nearby inland areas. Rogue waves (including a phenomenon named the "Three Sisters") are known to occur on the Great Lakes, including waves reinforced by reflections from the vertical shores of some of the lakes. Waves on the Great Lakes (especially the shallower ones) can be steeper and closer together than on the ocean allowing less recovery time between waves. Compared to the ocean, the Great Lakes also have less maneuvering "sea room" and closer proximity to shores making it more difficult for ships to weather storms.

Prelude

The Great Lakes Storm of 1913 was first noticed on Thursday November 6 on the western side of Lake Superior, moving rapidly toward northern Lake Michigan. The weather forecast in The Detroit News predicted "moderate to brisk" winds at the Great Lakes with occasional rain on Thursday night or Friday for the upper lakes (except southern Lake Huron) and fair-to-unsettled conditions for the lower lakes. This gale lasted until late November 10 and almost forced Cornell ashore.

Storm 
At the time, the U.S. Weather Bureau did not have enough data, communications, analysis capability, and understanding of atmospheric dynamics to predict or understand the storm.  They also were unable to predict wind directions to allow ships to avoid or cope with the effects of the storm. More modern studies of the available information and data from the storm provide better descriptions of its weather mechanisms, and treat it as two storms. 

By November 7 a string of low pressure centers in Canada had consolidated into a low pressure center southwest of Lake Superior which became "Storm #1". At the same time warm air pushed into the central Great Lakes from the south. By November 8 this storm was moving east through northern Lake Huron while strong northerly winds developed behind it over Lake Superior. By November 9 Storm #2 had formed over the Carolinas and Virginia. The northern portion of this storm began sweeping warm moist Atlantic air over colder air in the Ohio area producing heavy snows. The northwest portion of this extremely powerful storm began creating strong winds from the north along the long axis of Lake Huron, building large waves. By November 10, 24 hours of such building had created immense waves which ships were subjected to along with the high winds, as the center of the storm crossed north/northwest over Lake Erie near Toronto. Surface pressures went as low as 968.5 millibars, the lowest of the 1913 storm. 

Winds exceeding hurricane force occurred over four of the Great Lakes for extended periods.

November 7 

On Friday, the weather forecast in the Port Huron Times-Herald of Port Huron, Michigan, described the storm as "moderately severe". The forecast predicted increased winds and falling temperatures over the next 24 hours. At 10:00 a.m., Coast Guard stations and all 112 United States Department of Agriculture (USDA) Weather Bureau signal stations on the Great Lakes received a directive to hoist a square, red, signal flag with a black center and a red, triangular, maritime pennant below it, indicating a storm with winds of  that would blow from the southwest. After dark, a red lantern over a white one was displayed to warn of storm winds from the west.

November 8 

By Saturday, the storm's status had been upgraded to "severe". At 10:00 a.m., Coast Guard stations and USDA Weather Bureau offices at Lake Superior ports raised white pennants above square red flags with black centers, indicating a storm warning with northwesterly winds. The storm was centered over eastern Lake Superior, covering the entire lake basin. The weather forecast of the Port Huron Times-Herald stated  southerly winds had remained "moderate to brisk". Northwesterly winds had reached gale strength on northern Lake Michigan and western Lake Superior. Gale wind flags were raised at more than a hundred ports but many captains continued their journeys. Long ships traveled through the St. Marys River all that day, through the Straits of Mackinac all night, and up the Detroit and St. Clair rivers early the following morning.

The 472 foot steel bulk freighter L. C. Waldo, on Lake Superior, 18 hours out of Two Harbors was overrun by monster waves out of the northwest. Approximately 45 miles northeast of the Keweenaw Peninsula an estimated 50' rogue wave smashed the pilothouse, bent the steel floor of the compass room, swept the wheelsman out of the wheelhouse and tore three of the walls from the "texas", the level of the deck house below the pilothouse.  The captain ordered that the ship be turned around to try to reach shelter behind the Keweenaw. As recounted by second mate Feeger "The wind sent on gigantic wave after another over parts of the ship...The snow was so blinding that none of us could see 50 feet ahead".  Then the rudder failed; helpless without it, 70 MPH winds drove the ship aground on Gull Rock near Manitou Island.  With the bow wedged in the rocks, the hull shredded and a crack forming in the deck, the captain ordered everyone to the bow and that the ship be flooded to prevent the ship from being washed back into the depths of the lake. The steward's wife and her mother were reluctant to leave the stern and the crew struggled to carry them over hundreds of feet of open deck in the 70 MPH blizzard, including traversing a now-widening crack in the deck.  During the process the chief engineer and two stokers ran the ship at full power to try to wedge the bow further onto the shore.  Then they abandoned the stern and took shelter with the others in the unheated windlass room.

November 9  

By noon on Sunday, weather conditions on lower Lake Huron were close to normal for a November gale. Barometric pressures in some areas began to rise, bringing hopes of an end to the storm. The low pressure area that had moved across Lake Superior was moving northeast, away from the lakes. The U.S. Weather Bureau issued the first of its twice-daily reports at approximately 8:00 a.m.; it did not send another report to Washington, D.C. until 8:00 p.m. This proved to be a serious problem; the storm would have most of the day to build up hurricane-force winds before the Bureau headquarters in Washington, D.C., would have detailed information.

Along southeastern Lake Erie near Erie, Pennsylvania, a southern low-pressure area was moving toward the lake. This low had formed overnight so was absent from Friday's weather map. It had been moving northward but turned northwestward after passing over Washington, D.C. The low's intense, counterclockwise rotation was made apparent by the changing wind directions around its center. In Buffalo, New York, morning northwest winds had shifted to the northeast by noon and to the southeast by 5:00 p.m., with gusts of up to  occurring between 1:00 p.m. and 2:00 p.m. The fastest gust in Cleveland, occurred at 4:40 p.m. At Buffalo, barometric pressure dropped from 29.52 inHg (999.7 hPa) at 8:00 a.m. to 28.77 inHg (974.3 hPa) at 8:00 p.m.

The rotating low continued northward into the evening, bringing its counterclockwise winds in phase with the northwesterly winds already hitting Lakes Superior and Huron. This resulted in a dramatic increase in northerly wind speeds and swirling snow. Ships on Lake Huron that were south of Alpena, Michigan—especially around Harbor Beach and Port Huron in Michigan, and Goderich and Sarnia in Ontario—experienced massive waves moving southward toward St. Clair River. Some ships sought shelter along the Michigan shore or between Goderich and Point Edward. Three of the larger ships were found upside down, indicating extremely high winds and tall waves. The worst damage was done on Lake Huron as ships sought shelter along its southern end. The lake's shape allowed northerly winds to increase unimpeded because water has less surface friction than land and because the wind followed the lake's length.

Weather forecasters of the time did not have enough data or understanding of atmospheric dynamics to predict or comprehend the events of Sunday November 9. Frontal mechanisms, which were then referred to as "squall lines", were not yet understood. Surface observations were only collected twice daily at stations around the country; by the time these data were collected and maps were hand-drawn, the information was no longer representative of the actual weather conditions.

November 10 and 11 
The storm had moved northeast of London, Ontario on the morning of Monday November 10, with lake effect blizzards behind it. Streetcar operators stayed with their stranded, powerless vehicles for two nights, eating food provided by local residents. Travelers were forced to take shelter and wait for the storm to pass.

By Tuesday, the storm was rapidly moving across eastern Canada. Without the warm lake waters, it quickly lost strength. the system carried less snowfall because of its speed and the lack of lake effect snow. All shipping along the St. Lawrence River around Montreal, Quebec, was halted on Monday and part of Tuesday.

Aftermath 
The storm was the deadliest, most destructive natural disaster in recorded history to hit the lakes. The Great Lakes Storm killed more than 250 people, destroyed 19 ships and stranded 19 others. About $1 million of cargo—including coal, iron ore, and grain—weighing about 68,300 tons was lost.

Surrounding shoreline 

Along the shoreline, blizzards stopped traffic and communication, causing hundreds of thousands of dollars in damage. There were  snowdrifts around Lake Huron. Electricity supply was disrupted for several days across Michigan and Ontario, cutting off telephone and telegraph communications. A recently completed US$100,000 breakwater at Chicago, which was intended to protect the Lincoln Park basin from storms, was swept away in a few hours. The Milwaukee, Wisconsin, harbor lost its south breakwater and much of the surrounding South Park area that had been recently renovated.

After the final blizzards hit Cleveland, the city was paralyzed under feet of ice and snow, and was without power for days. Telephone poles were broken and power cables lay in tangled masses. Nearly all rail traffic was halted for days. The November 11 Plain Dealer described the aftermath: "Cleveland lay in white and mighty solitude, mute and deaf to the outside world, a city of lonesome snowiness, storm-swept from end to end, when the violence of the two-day blizzard lessened late yesterday afternoon."  William H. Alexander, Cleveland's chief weather forecaster, commented:

Take it all in all—the depth of the snowfall, the tremendous wind, the amount of damage done and the total unpreparedness of the people—I think it is safe to say that the present storm is the worst experienced in Cleveland during the whole forty-three years the U.S. Weather Bureau has been established in the city.

There was a small death toll in Cleveland considering the severity of the storm. Sources describe one freezing death, plus some deaths from accidents. One death and one near death were from downed power lines. Immediately following the blizzard in Cleveland, the city began a campaign to move all utility cables underground in tubes beneath major streets. The project took five years.

On the lakes 

The greatest damage was done on the lakes. Major shipwrecks occurred on all but Lake Ontario, with most happening on southern and southwestern Lake Huron. Captains said waves reached at least  in height. These waves were shorter in length than waves usually formed by gales and occurred in rapid succession. Rocky shores prevalent on the Great Lakes reflect rather than absorb waves.

Determining the identity of this "mystery ship" became a national interest, resulting in daily front-page newspaper articles. The ship eventually sank and was identified on November 15 as Charles S. Price. The front page of that day's Port Huron Times-Herald extra edition read: "BOAT IS PRICE —DIVER IS BAKER — SECRET KNOWN". Milton Smith, an assistant engineer who decided at the last moment not to join his crew on premonition of disaster, helped identify bodies from the wreck. Among the debris cast up by the storm was the wreckage of the fish tug Searchlight, which was lost in April 1907.

The final tally of financial loss included US$2,332,000 for totally lost vessels, $830,900 for vessels that became constructive total losses, $620,000 for vessels stranded but returned to service, and approximately $1,000,000 in lost cargoes. This figure excludes financial losses in coastal cities.

While the storm was the main cause of damage on the lakes, human factors, including measures that could have reduced the storm's effects but were not taken, also contributed.  Post-storm conversations mostly focused on placing blame but served to highlight weaknesses. The U.S. Weather Bureau did not have the ability to predict the storm but hesitated to admit its limitations because it wanted to secure higher budgets. Instead, it focused on the terminology and nature of warnings. Another factor was the underpowering of large ships that affected their ability to travel, maneuver, and hold steady in severe storms. Even with both anchors dropped and steaming full power into the wind, several were unable to avoid being carried backward. For example, the  Charles S. Price had a single 1,760 horsepower engine. Three years after the storm, the same shipyard built a  freighter with only 1,800 horsepower. 

The geometry of the lakes and locks combined with operational economics dictated the use of slimmer, shallower ships than comparable ocean-going vessels, reducing stability and structural strength. The "straight deck" ship design was becoming prevalent, requiring more and larger hatch covers, which increased vulnerability to storms.  Insufficient strength of the large hatches and their fastenings was also noted, as well as the shortness of the  hatch coamings. The limited compartmentalization of cargo holds meant the flooding of one compartment was sufficient to sink the ship. The practice of not "trimming" or leveling the pyramid-shape piles of bulk solid cargo made them more prone to shifting and causing a capsize. Many raised concern about the practice of shipping companies incentivizing or pressuring captains to sail during the dangerous November season and during dangerous weather. These concerns continued and were echoed 62 years later after the sinking of the Edmund Fitzgerald. Few of these factors were acted upon.  One change was that the weather service clarified their previous ambiguity and said that they would post a higher-than-gale level warning for the most severe predicted storms.

Ships foundered 

The ships that sank during the storm with their entire crew killed are ordered in the table below by the number of victims. The table does not include the three victims from the freighter William Nottingham, who volunteered to leave the ship on a lifeboat in search of assistance. Most of the bodies were recovered on the Canadian shores of southern Lake Huron. The lost ships included some of the newest and largest ships on the Great Lakes.

See also 

 October 2010 North American storm complex
 List of storms on the Great Lakes

References

Notes

Citations

References

Further reading

External links 

 Personal experiences of Captains of the Lake Fleet.

Great Lakes
1913 meteorology
1913 natural disasters
1913-11
1913-11
Shipwrecks in the Great Lakes
1913 natural disasters in the United States
1913 in Michigan
1913 in Ohio
1913 in Ontario
History of Cleveland
Lake Huron
Natural disasters in Ontario
November 1913 events
1913 disasters in Canada